George Rice Chitwood (April 14, 1912 – January 3, 1988), nicknamed "Joie", was an American racecar driver and businessman. He is best known as a daredevil in the Joie Chitwood Thrill Show.

Background
Chitwood was born in Denison, Texas. He was orphaned as a 14-year-old and he ended school after 8th grade. He lived in the Dust Bowl-era at Topeka, Kansas and was seeking employment during the Great Depression. His main job was a shoe shiner and he was a candy butcher at a burlesque show to earn more money. He started learning a trade by helping at a welding shop.

Nickname
He was dubbed "Joie" during his racing career after a newspaper reporter mis-took and misspelled his name in an article. The writer confused St. Joe, Missouri (where Chitwood's race car was built) with "George", and when it was typeset, added an "i" by mistake to spell "Joie." The nickname stuck for life. Chitwood marketed himself as being of Cherokee descent and thus was called the “Raging Cherokee”.

Racing career
Chitwood built his first racecar from an Essex and drove the car after the driver didn't show up; he finished second. He started his racecar driving career in 1934 at a dirt track in Winfield, Kansas. From there, he began racing sprint cars. In 1937 and 1938, he finished second in the Central States Racing Association (CSRA). In 1939 and 1940 he switch to a different circuit and won the AAA East Coast Sprint car championship. He switched back to the CSRA and won its title in 1942. He won 14 consecutive CSRA features that season. Between 1940 and 1950 he competed at the Indianapolis 500 seven times, finishing fifth on three occasions. He was the first man ever to wear a safety belt at the 1941 Indianapolis 500. Chitwood took the belt out of his dirt car because he liked how he was jostled around less and would help keep his foot on the throttle. Chitwood promised AAA officials Rex Mays and Wilbur Shaw that he would release the belt in the event of a crash because drivers thought that it was safer to be thrown from the car. He won six major sprint car races in 1946. Chitwood won nine AAA East Coast features in 1947, including the first race at Williams Grove Speedway. He retired from racing in 1950.

Joie Chitwood Thrill Show
In 1942, stuntman Earl "Lucky" Teter died and Chitwood took over his show after being asked by his widow to sell Teter's equipment. Chitwood was unable to find a buyer during World War II. Chitwood was deemed 4-F so he taught welding at factories. He began to operate the "Joie Chitwood Thrill Show." The show was an exhibition of auto stunt driving that became so successful he cut back significantly in racing. Often called "Hell Drivers," he had five units that for more than forty years toured across North America thrilling audiences in large and small towns alike with their death-defying automobile stunts. Chitwood performed a ramp-to-ramp jump with a car that was devised by Teter. Chitwood and his son Joie Jr. perfected driving a car on two wheels.

His show was so popular, that in January 1967, the performance at the Islip Speedway, New York was broadcast on ABC television's Wide World of Sports.

His sons, Joie Jr. and Tim, both joined the auto thrill show and continued to run the "Joie Chitwood Chevy Thunder Show" after their father's retirement. The Chitwood show toured the U.S. from 1945 to 1998. Grandson Joie Chitwood III became president of the International Speedway Corporation, and served as president of Daytona International Speedway and Indianapolis Motor Speedway.

The show was featured during season 3 of CHiPs in an episode entitled "Thrill Show". Joie Jr. did stunts for Miami Vice on several occasions. Joie Jr. also appeared as a guest challenger on the TV game show To Tell The Truth. Joie Jr. worked in over 60 feature films and national commercials.

In 1984 the show was featured in the movie Smokey and the Bandit Part 3, where Sheriff Justice ends up the star of the show during his pursuit of The Bandit.

Chitwood's show was credited by Evel Knievel as being his inspiration to become a daredevil when his show appeared in his home town of Butte, Montana.

Stuntman
Chitwood was frequently hired by Hollywood film studios to either do stunt driving for films or to act as auto-stunt coordinator. Chitwood was one of the stunt drivers in the Clark Gable and Barbara Stanwyck 1950 film about auto racing, To Please a Lady.

In 1973, Joie Chitwood Jr. is credited as a Stunt Coordinator for the hugely successful James Bond film Live and Let Die, where he was also the stunt driver and acted in a minor part.

Safety Consultant
Joie Chitwood Jr. also acted as a car safety consultant, intentionally crashing vehicles for subsequent investigation. He had intentionally crashed more than 3000 vehicles by the time he appeared on the game show I've Got A Secret in 1965.
Joie Jr. and Joie Sr. test-crashed guardrails and breakaway Interstate signs for US Steel and aluminum light poles for ALCOA.

Family life
Chitwood met his future wife Marie when she was a dancer; she quit dancing at their marriage. The couple had two sons - Timmy and Joie Jr. (born 1944) Joie Jr. had a son Joie Chitwood III (born 1971).

Retirement and death
When Chitwood retired, his sons took over the business. Joie Chitwood died on January 3, 1988, aged 75, in Tampa Bay, Florida.

Legacy
Chitwood was named the President of the 100 Mile An Hour Club at Indianapolis in 1967. The Eastern Auto Racing Club Old Timers Club inducted him in 1979 and received the Walt Ader Memorial Award in 1986.  He was inducted in the National Sprint Car Hall of Fame in 1993. Chitwood was inducted into the Motorsports Hall of Fame of America in 2010. Among his contributions to the sport was the supervision of the construction of Pennsylvania's Selinsgrove Speedway in 1945.

Filmography

Indianapolis 500 results

* shared drive with Tony Bettenhausen

Complete Formula One World Championship results
(key)

 * Indicates shared drive with Tony Bettenhausen.

References

External links
Sport: Joie Chitwood's Indianapolis Thrill Show (De Lachance Productions)
 

1912 births
1988 deaths
Indianapolis 500 drivers
National Sprint Car Hall of Fame inductees
AAA Championship Car drivers
American stunt performers
Stunt drivers
Racing drivers from Tampa, Florida
People from Denison, Texas
Racing drivers from Texas